The Gribov Medal is a prize awarded every two years since 2001 by the European Physical Society for work in theoretical elementary particle physics or quantum field theory. It is awarded to younger physicists (age under 35) and is named after Vladimir Naumovich Gribov.

Prize Winners

External links 

 Official Website
 The Gribov Medal Prizes (EPS Website)

References 

Physics awards
Early career awards
Awards of the European Physical Society